Louis Florencie (4 December 1896 – 4 December 1951) was a French film actor. He appeared in more than 80 films between 1927 and 1951.

Selected filmography

 Companion Wanted (1932)
 Beauty Spot (1932)
 Suzanne (1932)
 Night Shift (1932)
 Clochard (1932)
 Ciboulette (1933)
 600,000 Francs a Month (1933)
 Madame Bovary (1934)
 Bach the Detective (1936)
 Moutonnet (1936)
 The Lover of Madame Vidal (1936)
 Lady Killer (1937)
 The House Opposite (1937)
 Return at Dawn (1938)
 Barnabé (1938)
 There's No Tomorrow (1939)
 The Porter from Maxim's (1939)
 Coral Reefs (1939)
  Prince Charming (1942)
 The Island of Love (1944)
 The Last Metro (1945)
 My First Love (1945)
 Patrie (1946)
Coincidences (1947)
 Night Express (1948)
 Return to Life (1949)
 Two Loves (1949)

References

External links

1896 births
1951 deaths
French male film actors
20th-century French male actors